Guo Kang (born 14 February 1988) is a male Chinese rower, who  competed for Team China at the 2008 Summer Olympics.

References

1988 births
Living people
Chinese male rowers
Olympic rowers of China
Rowers at the 2008 Summer Olympics
Place of birth missing (living people)
21st-century Chinese people